The Inspector (a.k.a. Lisa) is a 1962 CinemaScope DeLuxe Color British-American drama film directed by Philip Dunne, starring Stephen Boyd and Dolores Hart. Hart plays Lisa Held, a Dutch-Jewish girl who has survived the horror of Auschwitz concentration camp.

Plot
In 1946 Holland, Lisa Held (Dolores Hart), a survivor of Auschwitz concentration camp during World War II, has fallen prey to ex-Nazi Thorens (Marius Goring), who has promised to smuggle her into Palestine. In reality, Thorens plans to send her to South America for sex work. Unbeknownst to them both, they are being trailed by Dutch Police Inspectors Peter Jongman (Stephen Boyd) and Sergeant Wolters (Donald Pleasence). Jongman carries the guilt of not having saved his Jewish fiancée, Rachel, from death at the hands of the Nazis. Jongman follows them to London, where he meets Thorens to discuss Lisa. During their encounter, Jongman strikes Thorens, who accidentally falls onto one of the imitation SS daggers he sells, and dies. Jongman thinks Thorens, who was moving when he left, has only been knocked down and leaves.

Upon returning to Amsterdam with Lisa, Jongman visits his own mother (Jean Anderson) and sister (Jane Jordan Rogers). Jongman’s mother initially believes Lisa is taking advantage of him until she reveals she was experimented on in Auschwitz. Later, Jongman visits Dutch police headquarters, and is confronted by his superiors about Thorens’ death. Jongman says he struck Thorens but did not kill him; he secretly suspects Lisa killed Thorens.

Jongman takes time off, and decides to help Lisa reach Palestine, probably to make amends for failing to save his Jewish girlfriend. Through contacts, Jongman finds work for them on a barge owned by Captain Brandt going to Paris. During the journey, Lisa and Jongman start to fall in love and gain the acceptance of the crusty but goodhearted Brandt.

Lisa and Jongman arrive at Tangiers, where they meet a Dutch smuggler named Klaus Van der Pink (Hugh Griffith), but his price to arrange passage to Palestine is too high. Jongman declares his feelings for Lisa but she rejects him  because she feels incapable of being a wife or a mother due to her Auschwitz medical experimentation, the effect of which on her reproductive organs she is uncertain about. Jongman finds out from a British agent named Roger Dickens (Robert Stephens) that he is wanted on suspicion of manslaughter for Thorens’ death. Jongman then seeks help from American Browne (Neil McCallum), who agrees to help them initially but then asks Lisa to instead testify at the Nuremberg War Trials when he hears of Lisa's experiences at Auschwitz.

Lisa agrees at first but Jongman encourages her to instead go to Palestine. Jongman arranges passage for them in one of Van der Pink's vessels in exchange for agreeing to captain for him for a year without pay. Knowing that the British will try to stop them, Jongman makes a deal: if they allow Lisa to enter Palestine, Jongman will surrender himself. During the passage, the British protect the ship from pirates.

Cast
 Stephen Boyd as Peter Jongman
 Dolores Hart as Lisa Held
 Leo McKern as Brandt
 Hugh Griffith as Klaus Van der Pink
 Donald Pleasence as Sergeant Wolters
 Harry Andrews as Ayoob
 Robert Stephens as Roger Dickens
 Marius Goring as Thorens
 Finlay Currie as De Kool
 Harold Goldblatt as Dr. Mitropoulos
 Neil McCallum as Browne
 Geoffrey Keen as Commissioner Bartels
 Jean Anderson as Mrs. Jongman
 Michael David as Captain Berger
 Jane Jordan Rogers as Anaka Jongman

Original Novel
The film was based on the novel The Inspector by Jan de Hartog, published in 1960. It was the first novel published by the new publishing house, Atheneum Publishing.

The New York Times called it "a sober and touching novel of the human condition." The Chicago Tribune called it "haunting".

Development
Film rights were bought by 20th Century Fox in October 1960. They assigned Nelson Gidding to do a script and Mark Robson to produce and direct.

In the novel, the male hero was a middle aged man haunted by the death of his Jewish fiancée. The script adaptation made it more of a romance between the man (now younger) and the woman.

In March 1961 Natalie Wood signed to play the lead. She dropped out and Robson cast Stephen Boyd and Dolores Hart – both under long term contracts to Fox. They had recently acted in "To the Sound of Trumpets" for Playhouse 90.

Robson ultimately decided not to direct and hired Phillip Dunne. Robson said, "Being just a producer, I don't seem to be working. I feel as though I dropped two-thirds of the job. If ever I had any doubts about it, this experience proves that directing a movie is unquestionably more important than producing it."

It was Dunne's 25th year of working at Fox.

Shooting
Filming started in England in mid 1961. Robson chose not to be present during the shoot. In June 1961 he said, "As to how the picture is to be made, I naturally have to bow to my director's artistic judgement. Until now it has been a community effort. Now I feel shut out of the project. When I last saw the actors I talked to them of the responsibility of actors to directors. For me, it was a terribly sad farewell, a sort of farewell address. It is terribly important for a producer to watch himself to avoid intruding on a director's prerogatives. I am determined I won't do it."

The film was going to be shot on location in Tangier. However due to political instability there, and insistence of the Moroccan government that the country only be filmed in a certain way, it was decided to film these scenes at Elstree Studios in London. There was location filming in Amsterdam.

The conclusion of this epic was filmed at Three Cliffs Bay on the Gower Peninsula in South Wales, UK. It is suggested that one of the film crew spotted the location during World War II when flying overhead in his aircraft.

In April 1962 the film's title was changed from The Inspector to Lisa for its American release, while it remained as The Inspector for its British release.

Reception
Bosley Crowther in The New York Times was critical of the advertising of the film, opening his review with "Don't let those lurid advertisements for 'Lisa' - those agonized blurbs that say such things as 'They experimented on me, sold me like human cargo' and 'Why am I terrified every time a man touches me?' - give you the wrong impression of this film. It is not a shocking sex picture. It is an uncommonly colorful and often tense adventure film." Advertising executives were not happy that he referred to the advertising in his review and noted that the quotes had been toned down since originally conceived.

The Los Angeles Times called the film "sluggish, tepid." The Philadelphia Inquirer said the film was an "absorbing drama," aided by overseas locations and the performances. The reviewer said Hart "escapes her ingenue parts of the past" and praised the supporting performers, calling Griffith a "droll delight."

References

External links 
 
 
 
 
 

1962 films
1962 drama films
Films directed by Philip Dunne
Films based on Dutch novels
British drama films
Films set in the Netherlands
Films set in Tangier
Films set in Mandatory Palestine
Films set in 1946
Films scored by Malcolm Arnold
20th Century Fox films
CinemaScope films
Films shot at MGM-British Studios
1960s English-language films
American drama films
1960s American films
1960s British films